Grzymała - is a Polish coat of arms. It was used by several szlachta families in the times of the Polish–Lithuanian Commonwealth.

History
Some authorities believe that this coat of arms was brought to Poland from Germany by a knight named Zylberschweg or Zelberszwecht. It is, however, one of the oldest Polish coats of arms, whose clan's war cry was Grzymała (for Thunder). The original homeland of this clan was the district of Łomża in Masovia. The coat of arms was later augmented to reflect a knight in full battle armor standing in the gate, whose left arm held a shield, whose right arm held a raised sword. This augmentation was received by Przecław Grzymała, for his courageous defense of the city Płock in 1078 against the Jatwings from Prince Władisław Hermann.

Subsequently the coat of arms was also abated: Prince Boleslaw Wstydliwy of Poland (1127–1179), exiled the knight Grzymała, owner of Goślice in the Palatinate of Płock, on the suspicion of treacherous dealings with Prince Kazimierz of Kujaw, and as further evidence of the Prince's displeasure closed the gate in this knight's coat of arms.

A second (though positive) abatement also occurred: When the Lithuanians along with the Jatwings attacked Masovia, a Grzymała, owner of Zielony and Slasy, courageously stood against them, inflicted a defeat upon them and hunted them down. For which feat of arms, the coat of arms was abated around the knight and the gate, leaving only a wall with towers, where there used to also be a rampart.

Blazon

Notable bearers
Notable bearers of this coat of arms include:
 Wawrzyniec Grzymala Goslicki
 Marcin Kazanowski
 Ignacy Prądzyński
 Janusz Suchywilk
 Mark Zbikowski
 Adam Grzymała-Siedlecki
 Eugene Gromczynski

Notes

External links 
  Grzymala 1st, 2nd & 3rd Coats of Arms and their bearers

See also
 Polish heraldry
 Heraldry
 Coat of arms

Polish coats of arms